A vacuum servo is a component used on motor vehicles in their braking system, to provide assistance to the driver by decreasing the braking effort. In the US it is commonly called a brake booster.

A vacuum servo also known as a power booster or power brake unit uses a vacuum to multiply the drivers pedal effort and apply that effort to the master cylinder.  It can not be used when the engine is off, mostly after a few attempts.

Notes

External links 
 What is a brake booster?
"How Power Brakes Work", (a 4-page basic tutorial article, with illustrations & animation) at HowStuffWorks.com

Brakes